Oscar Hammerstein may refer to:

Oscar Hammerstein I (1846–1919), cigar manufacturer, opera impresario and theatre builder
Oscar Hammerstein II (1895–1960), Broadway lyricist, songwriting partner of Jerome Kern and Richard Rodgers